Woodchute Wilderness is a 5,923-acre (2,397 ha) wilderness area in Prescott National Forest in the U.S. state of Arizona. A chute on the north side of the mountain helped transport wood to historic Jerome.

The wilderness lies within the Munds Draw and Hickey Mountain quadrangles of the national topographic map of the United States Geological Survey. Two trails totaling  cross the protected area. The main trail is Woodchute Trail #102, which connects to the  Rick Tank Cutoff Trail #104 in the southern part of the wilderness.

Ponderosa pine dominates the upper elevations of the reserve; pinyon pine and Utah juniper are more common at lower and dryer elevations. Wildlife includes American black bear, elk, cougar, mule deer, whitetail deer, bald eagles, and golden eagles. The reserve has views of the San Francisco Peaks to the north and the Verde Valley, including the red rocks of Sedona, to the east.

See also
 List of Arizona Wilderness Areas
 List of U.S. Wilderness Areas
 Wilderness Act

References

Protected areas of Yavapai County, Arizona
Wilderness areas of Arizona
Prescott National Forest